Patriarch Michael of Constantinople may refer to:

 Patriarch Michael I of Constantinople, Ecumenical Patriarch in 1043–1058
 Michael II of Constantinople, Ecumenical Patriarch in 1143–1146
 Michael III of Constantinople, Ecumenical Patriarch in 1170–1178
 Michael IV of Constantinople, Ecumenical Patriarch in 1207–1213